Miguel Irízar Campos C.P. (7 May 1934 – 19 August 2018) was a Spanish-born Peruvian Roman Catholic bishop.

Irízar Campos was born in Ormaiztegi, Spain and was ordained to the priesthood in 1957. He served as bishop of the Apostolic Vicariate of Yurimaguas, Peru, from 1972 to 1989. He then served as coadjutor bishop of the Roman Catholic Diocese of Callao, Peru from 1989 to 1995 and bishop of the diocese from 1995 to 2011. He was also member of former Vatican institution of Pontifical Council Cor Unum.

Notes

1934 births
2018 deaths
21st-century Roman Catholic bishops in Peru
Spanish Roman Catholic bishops in South America
20th-century Roman Catholic bishops in Peru
Roman Catholic bishops of Callao
Roman Catholic bishops of Yurimaguas
Passionist bishops